HMS Ossory was a reciprocating engine-powered  built for the Royal Navy during the Second World War. She commissioned too late for service in the conflict, but was in service during the Cold War period. She was scrapped in 1959.

Design and description
The ships' complement consisted of 85 officers and ratings.

The reciprocating ships had two vertical triple-expansion steam engines, each driving one shaft, using steam provided by two Admiralty three-drum boilers.

The Algerine class was armed with a QF  Mk V anti-aircraft gun and four twin-gun mounts for Oerlikon 20 mm cannon. The latter guns were in short supply when the first ships were being completed and they often got a proportion of single mounts. By 1944, single-barrel Bofors 40 mm mounts began replacing the twin 20 mm mounts on a one for one basis. All of the ships were fitted for four throwers and two rails for depth charges.

Construction and career
Ossory was laid down by the Port Arthur Shipbuilding Co., Thunder Bay, Ontario, on 20 November 1943 and was launched on 3 October 1944. She was completed on 29 September 1945.

Ossory commissioned too late for service in World War II, joining the 4th Minesweeping Flotilla in January 1946 and serving in the Fishery Protection Squadron from 1946–1947. She was reduced to reserve at Portsmouth in 1948.

Ossory was scrapped at Troon, Scotland from 4 March 1959.

References

Bibliography

External links
  HMS Ossory at uboat.net
 HMS Ossory at battleships-cruisers.co.uk

 

Algerine-class minesweepers of the Royal Navy
Ships built in Ontario
1944 ships
World War II minesweepers of the United Kingdom